is a 1986 video game developed and published by Taito exclusively in Japan. It is based on a Japanese sports manga series written and illustrated by Motoka Murakami that focuses on kendo, simply titled Musashi no Ken. The gameplay and design in the one-on-one fighting parts resemble Taito's other fighting game, Great Swordsman, especially its kendo mode.

Plot
The game's plot is about the son of two Kendo champions named Musashi. He strives to become as great at Kendo as his parents. The entire story centers around the world of Kendo and its up-and-coming competitors. The anime is broken up into two parts. The first part follows Musashi's early years in grade school while the second part follows his high school years. In the first episode, Musashi befriends an Akita puppy who is by his side throughout the series.

Gameplay
There are two different modes: single player and two player VS. mode. On single player mode, the player depicts Musashi in the middle of his training. He must run through several obstacle courses collecting swords and other items along the way. At the same time, his pet Akita will be running the course behind him. Musashi must not fall too far behind his dog. After completing three courses, Musashi will be entered into a 2D weapon-based versus fighting-style Kendo tournament. He must defeat five competitors to win the tournament. The swords that Musashi collects during the obstacle courses provide him with access to special strike moves if he has collected enough. If the player succeeds in winning, the game will continue from the beginning at a higher level of difficulty. After winning the championship a second time, the game is over.

On two player vs. mode, each player selects from a roster of competitors, and selects them secretly by pressing different inputs on the control pad. The selections are revealed once five selections have been made. Each player then squares off in a Kendo match with each of their selections. Whoever gets three or more victories wins the game.

1986 video games
Action video games
Japan-exclusive video games
Taito games
Multiplayer video games
Nintendo Entertainment System games
Nintendo Entertainment System-only games
Video games based on anime and manga
Video games developed in Japan